WIFN may refer to:

WIFN (AM) 1340 in Atlanta, Georgia
WAYS (AM) 1500 in Macon, Georgia
WLXF 105.5 in Macon, Georgia